Hugh Stewart may refer to:

 Hugh Stewart (film editor) (1910–2011), British film editor and producer
 Sir Hugh Stewart, 2nd Baronet (1792–1854), MP for Tyrone 1830–1835
 Hugh Stewart (cricketer) (1907–1995), Scottish cricketer
 Hugh Stewart (Canadian politician), MLA for Comox in the Legislative Assembly of British Columbia, 1916–1920
 Hugh Stewart (tennis) (b. 1928), American tennis player, winner of the doubles at the Pacific Coast Championships in 1959
 Hugh Stewart (sport shooter), Northern Ireland sport shooter
 Hugh Alexander Stewart (1871–1956), Canadian politician
 Hugh Fraser Stewart  (1863–1948), British academic, churchman and literary critic
 Hugh Stewart (classical scholar) (1884–1934), New Zealand university professor, classicist, military leader and historian